Lars Thomas "Lasse" Nilsson (born 3 January 1982) is a Swedish former professional footballer who played as a forward. Best remembered for his time with IF Elfsborg, he also represented clubs in the Netherlands, France, and Denmark. He won two caps for the Sweden national team.

Club career
Nilsson played for IK Brage, IF Elfsborg, sc Heerenveen, Aalborg Boldspilklub and AS Saint-Étienne. In 2007, Nilsson was loaned to Elfsborg from SC Heerenveen. Nilsson signed for Saint-Étienne on 8 August 2007, after leaving Heerenveen, in a four-year deal worth up to €3 million. In January 2009 he moved to Vitesse Arnhem on loan, a move which became permanent when he signed a three-year deal in June 2009.

International career

Youth 
Nilsson played four games for the Sweden U19 team, and represented the Sweden U21 team a total of 10 times, including at the 2004 UEFA European Under-21 Championship where Sweden finished fourth.

Senior 
He made his full international debut for the Sweden national team in a friendly game against Norway on 22 January 2004, replacing Mats Rubarth in the 58th minute of a 0–3 loss. He won his second and last international cap on 15 November 2006, in a friendly game against the Ivory Coast. Nilsson started the game and played for 64 minutes before being replaced by Fredrik Berglund in a 0–1 loss.

References

External links

1982 births
Living people
People from Borlänge Municipality
Association football forwards
Swedish footballers
Sweden international footballers
Sweden under-21 international footballers
IK Brage players
IF Elfsborg players
SC Heerenveen players
AS Saint-Étienne players
AaB Fodbold players
SBV Vitesse players
Norrby IF players
Allsvenskan players
Superettan players
Danish Superliga players
Eredivisie players
Ligue 1 players
Swedish expatriate footballers
Swedish expatriate sportspeople in the Netherlands
Expatriate footballers in the Netherlands
Swedish expatriate sportspeople in France
Expatriate footballers in France
Swedish expatriate sportspeople in Denmark
Expatriate men's footballers in Denmark
Sportspeople from Dalarna County